

Main cast 

♦ "The Rainbow" production   ♥ Science Fiction Theatre of Liverpool production  ♠ Theatr Clwyd Production

Additional cast for the Secondary Phase 
 Covering the BBC Radio 4 Secondary Phase (1979—1980).

{|class="wikitable"
|-
! colspan="2" |Cast lists for Radio Series Two of The Hitchhiker's Guide to the Galaxy.
|-
! style="background:#efefef;" |Character's Name
! style="background:#efefef;" |Secondary Phase
|-
|Frogstar Robot
 Geoffrey McGivern
|-
|Arcturan Number One
 Bill Paterson
|-
|Arcturan Captain/Radio Voice
David Tate
|-
|Hitchhiker's Guide Receptionist
David Tate
|-
|Lift
David Tate
|-
|Roosta
 Alan Ford
|-
|Frogstar Prisoner Relations Officer
David Tate
|-
|Gargravarr
Valentine Dyall
|-
|Vogon Captain
Bill Wallis
|-
|Vogon Guard
Stephen Moore/David Tate
|-
|Vogon Computer
David Tate
|-
|Ventilation System
Geoffrey McGivern
|-
|Nutrimat Machine
Leueen Willoughby
|-
|Zaphod Beeblebrox IV
Richard Goolden
|-
|Bird One 
Ronald Baddiley
|-
|Bird Two 
John Baddeley
|-
|Wise Old Bird 
John le Mesurier
|-
|Footwarrior
John Baddeley
|-
|Lintilla (and her clones) 
Rula Lenska
|-
|Hig Hurtenflurst
Marc Smith
|-
|Film Commentator
David Tate
|-
|Computeach
David Tate
|-
| Pupil
Stephen Moore
|-
|Varntvar the priest
Geoffrey McGivern
|-
|Android Stewardess
Rula Lenska
|-
|The Allitnils
David Tate
|-
|Poodoo
Ken Campbell
|-
|Autopilot
Jonathan Pryce
|-
|Zarniwoop (Vann Harl)
Jonathan Pryce
|-
|Man in the Shack
<TD>Stephen Moore
|-
! style="background:#efefef;" |Character's Name
! style="background:#efefef;" |Secondary Phase
|-
|}

Additional cast for the Tertiary to Quintessential Phases
 Covering the BBC Radio 4 radio series 3-5 (2004–2005) and the Bavarian Radio/Southwest radio adaptations in 1990-1991.

References

 
 

Lists of actors by film series
Lists of radio actors
Lists of actors by science fiction television series
Lists of actors by British television series
Cast|Cast lists